Belval-Université railway station is a railway station serving the neighbourhood of Belval, in west of Esch-sur-Alzette, in southern Luxembourg.  It is operated by Chemins de Fer Luxembourgeois, the state-owned railway company.

The station is situated on Line 60, which connects Luxembourg City to the Red Lands of the south of the country. The station was formerly open as Belval-Usines but as part of the overall regeneration of the Belval district, the station was entirely rebuilt and modernised.

External links
 Official CFL page on Belval-Université station
 Rail.lu page on Belval-Usines station

Railway stations in Esch-sur-Alzette
Railway stations on CFL Line 60